Moon Su-hyeon (born 25 March 1998) is a South Korean handball player for the Korea National Sport University and the South Korean national team.

She participated at the 2019 World Women's Handball Championship.

References

1998 births
Living people
South Korean female handball players
21st-century South Korean women